Adrián Alonso García Sobarzo (born May 25, 1978) is a former professional from Chile.

Born in Concepción, Chile, García achieved a career-high singles ranking of world No. 103 in September 2004. His best achievement in singles was reaching the quarterfinals of the 2004 Sopot Open, where he lost to Félix Mantilla in straight sets.

García also achieved three silver medals in the Pan American Games during his career: one at Santo Domingo 2003 and two at Rio de Janeiro 2007.

Performance timeline

Singles

ATP Challenger and ITF Futures finals

Singles: 23 (11–12)

Doubles: 27 (13–14)

Team competitions (3 runner-ups)
Singles

Doubles

References

External links

 
 
 

1978 births
Living people
Chilean male tennis players
Sportspeople from Concepción, Chile
Tennis players from Santiago

Tennis players at the 2003 Pan American Games
Tennis players at the 2007 Pan American Games
Pan American Games silver medalists for Chile
Pan American Games medalists in tennis
Tennis players at the 1999 Pan American Games
Medalists at the 2003 Pan American Games
Medalists at the 2007 Pan American Games
21st-century Chilean people